Lopidella is a genus of plant bugs in the family Miridae. There are about five described species in Lopidella.

Species
These five species belong to the genus Lopidella:
 Lopidella birama Knight, 1965
 Lopidella flavoscuta Knight, 1925
 Lopidella knighti Schaffner, 1969
 Lopidella luteicollis Knight, 1965
 Lopidella oaxacensis Schaffner, 1969

References

Further reading

 
 
 

Miridae genera
Articles created by Qbugbot
Orthotylini